Strzeszewo may refer to the following places:
Strzeszewo, Ciechanów County in Masovian Voivodeship (east-central Poland)
Strzeszewo, Płock County in Masovian Voivodeship (east-central Poland)
Strzeszewo, Podlaskie Voivodeship (north-east Poland)
Strzeszewo, Żuromin County in Masovian Voivodeship (east-central Poland)
Strzeszewo, Pomeranian Voivodeship (north Poland)